Porsgrunn videregående skole is an upper secondary school located in the town of Porsgrunn, in the county Telemark, in Norway. The school is Telemark county's biggest school together with Skien videregående skole, and has a total of 1150 students and about 170 employees. It is one of 24 schools in Norway to offer an IB Diploma Programme.

Secondary schools in Norway
International Baccalaureate schools in Norway
Buildings and structures in Porsgrunn
Telemark County Municipality